Wild animals, domestic animals and humans share a large and increasing number of infectious diseases, known as zoonoses. The continued globalization of society, human population growth, and associated landscape change further increase the interactions between humans and other animals, thereby facilitating additional infectious disease emergence. Contemporary diseases of zoonotic origin include SARS, Lyme disease and West Nile virus.

Disease emergence and resurgence in populations of wild animals are considered an important topic for conservationists, as these diseases can affect the sustainability of affected populations and the long-term survival of some species. Examples of such diseases include chytridiomycosis in amphibians, chronic wasting disease in deer, white-nose syndrome, in bats, and devil facial tumour disease in Tasmanian devils.

Prevention

Culling 

Disease outbreaks in wild animals are sometimes controlled by killing infected individuals to prevent transmission to domestic and economically important animals. Animal rights advocates argue against culling, as they consider individual wild animals to be intrinsically valuable and believe that they have a right to live.

Vaccination programs 

Wild animal suffering, as a result of disease, has been drawn attention to by some authors, who argue that we should alleviate this form of suffering through vaccination programs. Such programs are also deemed beneficial for reducing the exposure of humans and domestic animals to disease and for species conservation.

The oral rabies vaccine has been used successfully in multiple countries to control the spread of rabies among populations of wild animals and reduce human exposure. Australia, the UK, Spain and New Zealand have all conducted successful vaccination programs to prevent Bovine Tuberculosis, by vaccinating badgers, possums and wild boar.

In response to the COVID-19 pandemic, it has been proposed that, in the future, wild animals could be vaccinated against coronaviruses to relieve the suffering of the affected animals, prevent disease transmission and inform future vaccination efforts.

See also

 Epizootic
Threshold host density
Wildlife management

References

Further reading

External links
 Wildlife Disease Association

 
Animal welfare
Animals and humans